St Paul's Bow Common is a 20th-century church in Bow Common, London, England. It is an Anglican church in the Diocese of London. The church is at the junction of Burdett Road and St Paul's Way in the London Borough of Tower Hamlets. It replaced an earlier church that was designed by Rohde Hawkins in 1858 and financed by William Cotton of Leytonstone. Consecrated by Bishop Charles James Blomfield, this church was largely destroyed in the Second World War and demolished in the 1950s.

Architecture
The modern church was built in 1958–60, and the building is listed Grade II*. Its architects were Robert Maguire and Keith Murray. The Revd. Gresham Kirkby, a Christian anarchist, was the architects' engaged client, championing the Liturgical Movement principles and continuing as parish priest until 1994. St Paul's is one of the clearest and earliest centralised churches from this movement. Kirkby was succeeded by Revd. Prebendary Duncan Ross, who retired in October 2013.

The bold lettering wrapping around the porch reads 'Truly this is none other but the house of God. This is the Gate of Heaven' (Genesis 28:17), and was designed and cast in situ by Ralph Beyer.  An  mosaic by Charles Lutyens in  tesserae of coloured Murano glass (1963–68) is possibly the largest artist-created contemporary mosaic mural in Britain.  The church is currently home to Lutyens's 'Outraged Christ'.

Legacy
On 7 November 2013, the church won the National Churches Trust Diamond Jubilee Award for best Modern Church built in the UK since 1953.  The awards were judged by architecture critic Jonathan Glancey, director of the Twentieth Century Society Catherine Croft, president of the Ecclesiastical Architects and Surveyors Association Sherry Bates, and trustee of the National Churches Trust Richard Carr-Archer. The building was described by the judges as the ‘embodiment of the groundswell of ideas about Christian worship’ and a ‘hugely influential signpost for future Anglican liturgy’.

Present day
The current vicar is Mother Bernadette Hegarty.

References

External links 
 
 
 
 
 

Bow Common
Bow Common
Rebuilt churches in the United Kingdom
20th-century Church of England church buildings
Churches completed in 1960
Diocese of London
Bow Common